Leucopholiota lignicola is a species of fungus belonging to the family Agaricaceae.

Synonym:
 Lepiota lignicola P.Karst., 1879 (= basionym)

References

Agaricaceae